A cricket tournament was held at the 2022 Commonwealth Games in Birmingham, England, during July and August 2022. It was cricket's first inclusion in the Commonwealth Games since a List A men's tournament was held at the 1998 Commonwealth Games in Kuala Lumpur, Malaysia. The matches were played as Women's Twenty20 Internationals (WT20Is), with only a women's tournament being part of the Games.

Australia became the first team to qualify for the semi-finals, after winning their first two matches in Group A. New Zealand's win over Sri Lanka in the second round of matches ensured their own and England's progression to the semi-finals. India completed the semi-final line-up, beating Barbados in their final group match. India won the first semi-final, beating England by 4 runs. Australia won the second semi-final, beating New Zealand by 5 wickets.

New Zealand claimed the bronze medal after beating England by 8 wickets in the Bronze Medal Match. Australia claimed the gold medal, with India taking silver, after winning the Gold Medal Match by 9 runs. Australian batter Beth Mooney was the leading run-scorer in the tournament, with 179 runs, whilst India's Renuka Singh was the leading wicket-taker, with 11 wickets.

Schedule
The competition schedule for the cricket tournament was as follows:

In April 2021 the International Cricket Council (ICC) announced that all matches at the tournament would hold Twenty20 International status. The dates of the tournament were confirmed in June 2021.

Background
The Commonwealth Games 2022 was held in Birmingham, England, from 28 July to 9 August and had over 5,000 athletes representing 72 Commonwealth Games Associations taking part. Under Commonwealth Games rules, all core Commonwealth sports must be hosted but additional sports may be added by the local organising committee. In November 2018, the International Cricket Council (ICC) and the England and Wales Cricket Board (ECB) made a joint bid for a women's Twenty20 tournament to be included. In August 2019, the Commonwealth Games Federation announced that the bid had been successful after a vote of all 72 Commonwealth Games Associations with women's cricket being added to the 2022 programme along with beach volleyball and para table tennis. The Marylebone Cricket Club (MCC), as custodian of the Laws of Cricket, welcomed the move and hoped it would eventually lead to cricket's inclusion in the 2028 Summer Olympics.

Venues
The tournament was played in Twenty20 format with eight teams qualifying. Edgbaston Cricket Ground in Birmingham was the venue for the matches. Though there were suggestions for matches to also be held at the County Cricket Ground, Derby; New Road, Worcester; and Grace Road, Leicester, none of these were selected in the final confirmation.

Qualification
In November 2020, the ICC announced the qualification process for the 2022 Commonwealth Games tournament. England automatically qualified as the hosts, along with the six highest ranked sides as of 1 April 2021 as direct qualifiers. One further place was awarded to the winners of the 2022 Commonwealth Games Cricket Qualifier.

The allocation of the six direct qualifiers via the ICC Women's T20I rankings was dependent on the representation of at least four out of the six Commonwealth Games Federation regions (Africa, Americas, Asia, Caribbean, Europe and Oceania). If at least four regions were not represented from those in the top seven, then teams ranked eighth to tenth were the first to be considered to meet the criteria, before filling the remaining allocations from the rankings. Each team can enter a squad of up to 15 athletes.

As the West Indies qualified as a direct qualifier, the results of a separate tournament were originally going to be used to determine which Commonwealth Games Association (CGA) earned qualification. The tournament was scheduled to be contested between Barbados, Guyana, Jamaica, Trinidad and Tobago and two composite teams representing the Leeward Islands and Windward Islands. However, in August 2021, Cricket West Indies (CWI) confirmed that the regional qualifier had been postponed due to the COVID-19 pandemic. As a result, Barbados were selected to represent the West Indies, by virtue of being the Twenty20 Blaze defending champions. The Commonwealth Games Qualifier, to determine the final team, took place in Malaysia in January 2022. Sri Lanka won the qualifier, beating Bangladesh by 22 runs in the final match of the tournament, to secure their place at the Commonwealth Games.

Squads
The following squads were named for the tournament.

Prior to the Games, Lauren Down and Jess Kerr were both ruled out of New Zealand's squad with Lea Tahuhu and Claudia Green named as their replacements. India also named Simran Bahadur, Richa Ghosh and Poonam Yadav as standby players in their squad. Marizanne Kapp was ruled out of South Africa's squad due to family reasons. Trisha Chetty and Tumi Sekhukhune were also ruled out of South Africa's squad due to injuries. As a result, Delmi Tucker and Tazmin Brits were both added to their squad. England's captain Heather Knight was ruled out of their first match due to a hip injury, with Nat Sciver named as the team captain in her place.

Group stage
The schedule for the tournament was announced in June 2021, with the full list of fixtures being confirmed in November 2021. The ICC confirmed that all matches, including those involving Barbados (whose players would usually represent the West Indies), will be designated as Twenty20 Internationals.

Group A

 Advanced to the semi-finals

Group B

 Advanced to the semi-finals

Medal round

Semi-finals
The schedule and timings of the semi-finals were confirmed on 5 August 2022.

Bronze medal match

Gold medal match

Final standings
The final standings were as follows:

Statistics

Most runs

Most wickets

Notes

References

External links
 Series home at ESPN Cricinfo

Cricket at the Commonwealth Games
Cricket at the 2022 Commonwealth Games
International women's cricket competitions in England
International cricket competitions in 2022
2022 Commonwealth Games events